The Port of Nacala, also called the Nacala port complex, is a Mozambican port located in the cities of Nacala and Nacala-a-Velha. Is the deepest port in Southern Africa. The natural deep harbour serves landlocked Malawi with a  railway.

The infrastructure belongs to the Mozambican government, which is responsible for its administration through the public-private joint venture company "Integrated Northern Logistical Corridor Society" (CLIN). CLIN was created to administer licenses for cargo terminals in addition to passenger terminals.

Terminals 
There are four general cargo berths and one container berth. There are also plans to expand the port by adding a radioactive terminal and a storage facility. In January 2016 a coal terminal was completed in the town of Nacala-a-Velha, across the bay from the commercial port, and exports coal from the Moatize mine in western Mozambique.

Railway 
The Nacala railway system connects Moatize and Chipata, Zambia, through Malawi with the Port of Nacala. The railway system also connects Nampula, Malema, and Cuamba. In Cuamba, there is a junction which goes northeast to Lichinga. The line continues to Nayuchi, where it enters Malawi, and to Nkaya, where it divides, one branch going west to Mchinji and Chipata, and the other branch south to Moatize. The Mozambique government and Vale jointly created the Integrated Northern Logistical Corridor Society, to rehabilitate most of the existing line and build greenfield sections, a work completed in 2017, to export coal from mines in western Mozambique.

Countries served 
  Northern areas of the Mozambique
  The country of Malawi: the Port of Nacala is the nearest port to the landlocked country
  A railway extension serves parts of Zambia, in particular the inland port of Chipata

See also 
Railway stations in Mozambique
List of ports in Mozambique

References

External links 
 Port source.com/
 Ship movements through the port
 Rrdc
 AllBusiness

Nacala
Geography of Nampula Province
Buildings and structures in Nampula Province